Athénée Adolphe Max is a secondary school of the City of Brussels which is part of the official education network;. It is located to the east of the center of Brussels, near the Squares district .

Historical 
A first building was designed in 1904 by the architect Edmond De Vigne . In 1909 two secular schools were created. A first Carter high school for girls, later named Carter in homage to the first director, and an athenaeum for boys, later named Athénée Adolphe Max after the famous mayor of Brussels Adolphe Max. In 1978, the two secondary schools merged into a single athénée and adopted the name Athénée Adolphe Max in 1990.

Description 
The Adolphe Max Athenaeum is a school based on the promotion of effort in a respectful setting. The objective of the athénée is to transmit quality training to develop their intellectual and moral skills so that they have the level to approach higher education successfully.

The school has two courtyards :

 the Carter courtyard made up of three floors in which the Athénée Adolphe Max for boys was once located.
 the Max courtyard made up of three floors in which the Athénée Adolphe Max for boys was once located.

The establishment has a parents association (APMAX) and a very active Amnesty school group.

Famous students 

 Pierre Deline : mathematician
 Plastic Bertrand : singer and television presenter ;

References

External links 

 

Schools in Belgium
Buildings and structures completed in 1904
Buildings and structures in Brussels
1909 establishments in Belgium